Gigli Nsungani Ndefe (born 2 March 1994) is a professional footballer who plays as a right-back for Slovan Liberec on loan from Baník Ostrava in the Czech Republic. Born in the Netherlands, he plays for the Angola national team.

Club career
Ndefe formerly played for Eendracht Aalst, RKC Waalwijk and MFK Karviná. Besides the Netherlands, he has played in the Czech Republic. On 2 July 2019, he joined Czech club Karviná on a 2-year contract.

On 13 January 2021, Ndefe signed with Czech club Baník Ostrava on a two-year contract.

International career
Born in the Netherlands, Ndefe is of Angolan descent. He debuted for the Angola national team in a 2–1 2023 Africa Cup of Nations qualification win over Central African Republic on 1 June 2022.

References

External links
 

1994 births
Living people
Sportspeople from Weert
Angolan footballers
Angola international footballers
Dutch people of Angolan descent
Dutch sportspeople of African descent
Association football fullbacks
S.C. Eendracht Aalst players
TOP Oss players
RKC Waalwijk players
MFK Karviná players
FC Baník Ostrava players
Challenger Pro League players
Eerste Divisie players
Czech First League players
Angolan expatriate footballers
Dutch expatriate footballers
Expatriate footballers in Belgium
Expatriate footballers in the Czech Republic
Dutch expatriate sportspeople in Belgium
Dutch expatriate sportspeople in the Czech Republic
Footballers from Limburg (Netherlands)
Angolan expatriate sportspeople in the Czech Republic
Angolan expatriate sportspeople in Belgium
Dutch footballers
FC Slovan Liberec players